is a railway station in the village of Sekikawa, Niigata Prefecture, Japan, operated by East Japan Railway Company (JR East).

Lines
Echigo-Katakai Station is served by the Yonesaka Line, and is located 73.1 rail kilometers from the terminus of the line at Yonezawa Station.

Station layout
The station has one ground-level side platform serving a single bi-directional track. The station is unattended, but the station building also serves as a local public assembly hall.

History
Echigo-Katakai Station opened on 30 November 1933. The station was absorbed into the JR East network upon the privatization of JNR on 1 April 1987.

Surrounding area
 
 Arakawa River

See also
 List of railway stations in Japan

External links
 JR East Station information 

Railway stations in Niigata Prefecture
Yonesaka Line
Railway stations in Japan opened in 1933
Sekikawa, Niigata